Montreal Lake is a lake in the north-central part of Canadian province of Saskatchewan. It is the source of the Montreal River and is located between Highways 2 and 969. Prince Albert National Park is to the west and Clarence-Steepbank Lakes Provincial Park is to the east. Communities on the lake include Montreal Lake, Timber Bay, and Molanosa.

Description 
Montreal Lakes's catchment includes the northern slopes of the Waskesiu Hills and the southern and eastern slopes of the Thunder Hills. Waskasiu River is the primary inflow. It enters the lake at its south-western shore and its drainage basin includes the aforementioned Waskesiu Hills, Waskesiu Lake, and Kingsmere Lake. Also on the western shore is the Weyakwin River, which flows from Weyakwin Lake, and MacLennan River, which flows from the south side of the Thunder Hills. One of MacLennan River's tributaries, the Crean River, flows in from Crean Lake. At the southern tip of the lake, Bittern River flows in from Bittern Lake. Montreal River flows out of Montreal Lake at O'Connor Bay at the north end. Montreal River heads northward and flows into Lac la Ronge.

Fish species 
Fish commonly found in the lake include walleye, yellow perch, northern pike, lake trout, lake whitefish, cisco, burbot, white sucker, and longnose sucker.

See also 
List of lakes of Saskatchewan

References 

Lakes of Saskatchewan
Hudson's Bay Company trading posts